Jackie Price (born 15 August 1950) is a British bobsledder. He competed at the 1972, 1976 and the 1980 Winter Olympics.

References

External links
 

1950 births
Living people
British male bobsledders
Olympic bobsledders of Japan
Bobsledders at the 1972 Winter Olympics
Bobsledders at the 1976 Winter Olympics
Bobsledders at the 1980 Winter Olympics
Sportspeople from Pontypridd